Li Yunnan (born 2 February 1971) is a Chinese weightlifter. He competed in the men's light heavyweight event at the 1992 Summer Olympics. He also won a silver medal at the 1994 Asian Games.

References

External links
 

1971 births
Living people
Chinese male weightlifters
Olympic weightlifters of China
Weightlifters at the 1992 Summer Olympics
Place of birth missing (living people)
Asian Games medalists in weightlifting
Weightlifters at the 1994 Asian Games
Asian Games silver medalists for China
Medalists at the 1994 Asian Games
20th-century Chinese people